In taxonomy, Metallosphaera is a genus of the Sulfolobaceae.

References

Further reading

Scientific journals

Scientific books

Scientific databases

External links

Metallosphaera at BacDive -  the Bacterial Diversity Metadatabase

Archaea genera
Thermoproteota